Acastava is an extinct genus of trilobite in the order Phacopida, from the upper Pragian (A. atavus) to Emsian period (both other species listed) of the Devonian.

References

External links
 Acastava at the Paleobiology Database

Acastidae
Devonian trilobites
Fossils of Poland
Fossil taxa described in 1954